Clarence Rivers King (January 6, 1842 – December 24, 1901) was an American geologist, mountaineer and author. He was the first director of the United States Geological Survey from 1879 to 1881. Nominated by Republican President Rutherford B. Hayes, King was noted for his exploration of the Sierra Nevada mountain range.

Early life and education
Clarence King was born on January 6, 1842, the son of James Rivers King and Florence Little King. Clarence's father was part of a family firm engaged in trade with China, which kept him away from home a great deal, and he died in 1848, so Clarence was brought up primarily by his mother. By 1848, his two sisters, named Florence King and Grace King, had passed away early in their lives.

Clarence developed an early interest in outdoor exploration and natural history, which was encouraged by his mother and by Reverend Dr. Roswell Park, head of the Christ Church Hall school in Pomfret, Connecticut, that Clarence attended until he was ten. He then attended schools in Boston and New Haven and, at age thirteen, was accepted to the prestigious Hartford High School. He was a good student and a versatile athlete, of short stature but unusually strong.

His mother received an income from the King family business until it met with a series of problems and dissolved in 1857. After a few years of straitened circumstances, during part of which Clarence suffered from a serious depression, his mother married George S. Howland in July 1860 and had a daughter with him named Marian Howland. Howland financed Clarence's enrollment in the Sheffield Scientific School affiliated with Yale College in 1860.

College life and early career 

At Yale, King specialized in "applied chemistry" and also studied physics and geology. One inspiring teacher was James Dwight Dana, a highly regarded geologist who had participated in the United States Exploring Expedition, a scientific expedition to the South Atlantic, South Pacific and the west coasts of South and North America. At Yale, King enjoyed many sports, as he was a skilled athlete, but rowing was his main passion. He joined the rowing team at the university, and eventually became its captain. The Undine team competed on a four-man rowing boat, with King at the stroke oar. King later graduated with a Ph.B. in July 1862. That summer, he and several friends borrowed one of Yale's rowboats for a trip along the shores of Lake Champlain and a series of Canadian rivers, then returned to New Haven for the fall regatta.

In October 1862, on a visit to the home of his former professor, George Jarvis Brush, King heard Brush read aloud a letter he had received from William Henry Brewer telling of an ascent of Mount Shasta in California, then believed to be the tallest mountain in the United States. King began to read more about geology, attended a lecture by Louis Agassiz, and soon wrote to Brush that he had "pretty much made up my mind to be a geologist if I can get work in that direction". He was also fascinated by descriptions of the Alps by John Tyndall and John Ruskin.

In late 1862 or early 1863, King moved to New York City to share an apartment with James Terry Gardiner, a close friend from high school and college (who spelled his last name Gardner at the time). They associated with a group of American artists, writers and architects who were admirers of Ruskin. In February 1863, King became one of the founders, along with John William Hill, Clarence Cook and others, of the Ruskinian Association for the Advancement of Truth in Art, an American group similar to the Pre-Raphaelite Brotherhood, and was elected its first secretary. But he was anxious to see the mountains of the American West, and his friend Gardiner was miserable in law school.

By May 1863, King, Gardiner and an acquaintance named William Hyde traveled by railroad to Missouri and then joined a wagon train, which they left at Carson City, Nevada. King and Gardiner soon continued on to California, where King joined the California Geological Survey without pay, in which he worked with William H. Brewer, Josiah D. Whitney and later Gardiner and Richard D. Cotter. In July 1864, King and Cotter made the first ascent of a peak in the Eastern Sierra that King named Mount Tyndall in honor of one of his heroes. From there they discovered several higher peaks, including the one that came to be named Mount Whitney.

In September 1864, upon the designation by President Abraham Lincoln of the Yosemite Valley area as a permanent public reserve, King and Gardiner were appointed to make a boundary survey around the rim of Yosemite Valley. They returned to the East Coast by way of Nicaragua the following winter. King suffered from several bouts of malaria in spring and summer 1865 while Whitney, also in the East, worked on securing funding for further survey projects. King, Gardiner, Whitney and Whitney's wife sailed back to San Francisco in the fall, where Whitney lined up a survey project for King and Gardiner in the Mojave Desert and Arizona under U.S. Army auspices. 

They returned to San Francisco in the spring. King returned to Yosemite in the summer of 1866 to make more field notes for Whitney. When King heard of the death of his stepfather, he and Gardiner resigned from the Whitney survey and once again sailed to New York. They had been developing a plan for an independent survey of the Great Basin region for some time and, in late 1866, King went to Washington to secure funding from Congress for such a survey. He was elected to the American Philosophical Society in 1871.

Fortieth Parallel Survey and diamond hoax discovery 

King made a persuasive argument for how his research would help develop the West. He received federal funding and was named U.S. Geologist of the Geological Exploration of the Fortieth Parallel, commonly known as the Fortieth Parallel Survey, in 1867. He persuaded Gardiner to be his second in command and they assembled a team that included, among others, Samuel Franklin Emmons, Arnold Hague, A. D. Wilson, the photographer Timothy H. O'Sullivan and guest artist Gilbert Munger.

Over the next six years, King and his team explored areas from eastern California to Wyoming. During that time he also published his famous Mountaineering in the Sierra Nevada (1872). 
While King was finishing the 40th Parallel Survey, the western US was abuzz with news of a secret diamond deposit. King and some of his crew tracked down the secret location in northwest Colorado and exposed it as a fraud, now known as the Diamond hoax of 1872. He became an international celebrity through exposing the hoax.

In 1878, King published Systematic Geology, numbered Volume 1 of the Report of the Geological Exploration of the Fortieth Parallel, although it appeared later than all but one of the other seven volumes. In this work he narrated the geological history of the West as a mixture of uniformitarianism and catastrophism. This book was well received at the time and has been called "one of the great scientific works of the late nineteenth century".

In 1879, the US Congress consolidated the number of geological surveys exploring the American West and created the United States Geological Survey. King was chosen as its first director. He took the position with the understanding that it would be temporary and he resigned after twenty months, having overseen the organization of the new agency with an emphasis on mining geology. James Garfield named John Wesley Powell as his successor.

During the remaining years of his life, King withdrew from the scientific community and attempted to profit from his knowledge of mining geology, but the mining ventures he was involved in were not successful enough to support his expensive tastes in art collecting, travel and elegant living, and he went heavily into debt.  He had a busy social life, with close friendships including Henry Brooks Adams and John Hay, who admired him tremendously. But he suffered from physical ailments and depression.

Common law marriage and passing as African-American
King spent his last thirteen years leading a double life. In 1887 or 1888, he met and fell in love with Ada Copeland, an African-American nursemaid and former slave from Georgia, who had moved to New York City in the mid-1880s. As miscegenation was strongly discouraged in the nineteenth century, and illegal in many places, King hid his identity from Copeland. Despite his blue eyes and fair complexion, King convinced Copeland that he was an African-American Pullman porter named James Todd. 

The two entered into a common law marriage in 1888. Throughout the marriage, King never revealed his true identity to Ada, pretending to be Todd, a Black railroad worker, when at home, and continuing to work as King, a White geologist, when in the field. Their union produced five children, four of whom survived to adulthood. Their two daughters married White men. Their two sons served, classified as Black during World War I. King finally revealed his true identity to Copeland in a letter he wrote to her while on his deathbed in Arizona.

Death and legacy
King died on December 24, 1901, of tuberculosis in Phoenix, Arizona. He was buried in Newport, Rhode Island. Kings Peak in Utah, Mount Clarence King and Clarence King Lake at Shastina, California, are named in his honor, as is King Peak in Antarctica.
The US Geological Survey Headquarters Library in Reston, Virginia, is also known as the Clarence King Library.

Bibliography

Works about King
Emmons, Samuel Franklin (1903). Biographical Memoir of Clarence King
 Hague, James D., ed. (1904). Clarence King Memoirs. The Helmet of Mambrino. New York: Published for the King Memorial Committee of the Century Association by G.P. Putnam's Sons.
 Original drawings by L.F. Bjorklund. Extensive bibliography.

 King, one of four Americans on whom the author focuses, was influenced by Alexander von Humboldt.

Moore, James Gregory (2006), King of the 40th Parallel, Stanford University Press, ISBN 0-8047-5223-0

Works by King
 The Three Lakes: Marian, Lall, Jan and How They Were Named. 1870.
 Report of the Geological Exploration of the Fortieth Parallel.  United States Government Printing Office, 1870–1878.
 "On the Discovery of Actual Glaciers in the Mountains of the Pacific Slope," American Journal of Science and Arts, vol. I, March 1871.
 "Active Glaciers Within the United States," The Atlantic Monthly, vol. 27, no. 161, March 1871.
 Mountaineering in the Sierra Nevada. Boston : James R. Osgood and Company, 1872 (much of it previously published as articles in the Atlantic Monthly)
 "John Hay," Scribner's Monthly, v. 7, no. 6, Apr. 1874.
 "Catastrophism and Evolution," The American Naturalist, vol. 11, no. 8, August 1877.
"Address of Clarence King on Catastrophism" and "Catastrophism in Geology", Scientific American articles, 14 July 1877, pp. 16–17
 Statistics of the Production of the Precious Metals in the United States. United States Government Printing Office,  1881.
 The United States Mining Laws and Regulations Thereunder.... United States Government Printing Office, 1885.
 "The Helmet of Mambrino," The Century Magazine, Volume 32, no. 1, May 1886.
 "The Age of the Earth," American Journal of Science, vol. 45, January 1893.
 "Shall Cuba Be Free?," The Forum, September 1895.
 Report of the Public Lands Commission. United States Government Printing Office, 1903–1905.

References

External links

 USGS: The Four Great Surveys of the West
 Clarence King (1842–1901): Pioneering Geologist of the West, Geological Society of America
 Biographical memoir of Clarence King, 1842–1901 by Samuel Franklin Emmons.
 National Academy of Sciences Biographical Memoir
 
 
 

American geologists
American mountain climbers
American art critics
Explorers of the United States
United States Geological Survey personnel
1842 births
1901 deaths
History of the Sierra Nevada (United States)
Yale School of Engineering & Applied Science alumni
Impostors
Tuberculosis deaths in Arizona
20th-century deaths from tuberculosis
Burials in Rhode Island
Writers from Newport, Rhode Island